Ferrera di Varese is a comune (municipality) in the Province of Varese in the Italian region Lombardy, located about  northwest of Milan and about  northwest of Varese.

Ferrera di Varese borders the following municipalities: Cassano Valcuvia, Cunardo, Grantola, Masciago Primo, Rancio Valcuvia.

References